Diels is the last name of several people:
 Rudolf Diels (1900–1957), German politician
 Otto Diels (1876–1954), German scientist noted for his work on the Diels–Alder reaction
 Ludwig Diels (1874–1945), German botanist
 Hermann Diels (1848–1922), German classical scholar